Rožanj (Serbian Cyrillic: Рожањ) is a mountain in central Serbia, near the town of Ražanj. Its highest peak Veliki vrh has an elevation of  897 meters above sea level. It is practically merged with Bukovik mountain, and they are separated only by the pass Baraka (603 m). Lake Bovan is located on the southern foothills of the mountain.

References

Mountains of Serbia